Andulo Airport  is an airport serving Andulo, a city in Bié Province, Angola.

See also

 List of airports in Angola
 Transport in Angola

References

External links 
OpenStreetMap - Andulo
OurAirports - Andulo

Airports in Angola
Bié Province